Irondale is a city in Jefferson County, Alabama, United States. It is a suburb of Birmingham, northeast of Homewood and Mountain Brook. At the 2020 census, the population was 13,497. 

The city is the site of Catholic radio/television broadcaster Eternal Word Television Network, or (EWTN). The city's annual Whistle-Stop Festival attracts thousands to its eclectic mix of art, food and music.

History
On October 5, 1887, the people of Irondale petitioned for incorporation. The town incorporated as Irondale (after Irondale Furnace) on October 19, 1887, following a vote on October 17, 1887.

The 1916 Irondale earthquake, magnitude 5.1, caused some damage in the area, and was felt in neighboring states.

In 1981, Mother Angelica founded the Eternal Word Television Network, after starting operations in a garage.

On August 25, 2020, Irondale voters elected James D. Stewart, Jr. as the first black mayor in the city's history.

Geography

Demographics

2020 census

As of the 2020 United States census, there were 13,497 people, 5,161 households, and 3,022 families residing in the city.

2010 census
According to the 2010 census results, the population of the area was approximately 12,349 people. From 2000 to 2010, Irondale's population growth percentage was 25.8% (or from 9,813 people to 12,349 people). 23.1% of the Irondale city residents were under 18 years of age. Census 2010 race data for Irondale city include the racial breakdown percentages of 56.33% white, 35.38% black, 1.43% Asian and 7.78% Hispanic.  Also, there were 5,495 housing units in Irondale city, 92.5% of which were occupied housing units.

Education
Irondale is served by Jefferson County Board of Education and is home to Shades Valley High School, Grantswood Community School, Irondale Community School, Irondale Middle School, Shades Valley Theatre Academy, Jefferson Christian Academy, and the Jefferson County International Baccalaureate School.

Notable people
 Fannie Flagg, author of best-selling 1987 novel, Fried Green Tomatoes at the Whistle Stop Cafe used Irondale is the location of the Irondale Cafe.
 Marion Hobby, defensive line coach for the Cincinnati Bengals of the National Football League

Gallery

References

External links
City of Irondale
Irondale Public Library
Irondale Chamber of Commerce
Irondale Code of Ordinances

Cities in Alabama
Cities in Jefferson County, Alabama
Birmingham metropolitan area, Alabama